Macarostola paradisia is a moth of the family Gracillariidae. It is known from Sri Lanka.

The head of this species is ochreous-whitish, palpi smooth-scaled, crimson-pink. Legs white, partially suffused with yellowish. Forewings light crimson; base narrowly pale yellowish, a moderate subquadrate yellow spot on dorsum towards base; two elongate yellow spots on dorsum before an beyond middle of the wing.

References

Macarostola
Moths described in 1908